Fourquevaux is a commune in the Haute-Garonne department in southwestern France.

Population

Sights
The Château de Fourquevaux is a 15th- and 16th-century castle. With its 18th-century orangery, it has been listed since 1979 as a historic site by the French Ministry of Culture.

See also
Communes of the Haute-Garonne department

References

Communes of Haute-Garonne